Thurmon Lavelle "Bobby" Collins Jr. (October 25, 1933 – November 15, 2021) was an American college football coach. He served as head coach at the University of Southern Mississippi and Southern Methodist University. While at SMU, Collins saw the school's football program brought down by severe NCAA sanctions that led to the "death penalty" being applied to the program, including the cancellation of the entire 1987 season and being limited to only seven road games in 1988.  However, the school opted to sit out the 1988 season as well after virtually all of the team's experienced players went elsewhere.

He was born in Laurel, Mississippi. From 1975 to 1981, Collins coached at Southern Miss, and compiled a 48–30–2 record. In 1982, he was hired by SMU, signing a five-year deal with more than $100,000 annual salary. While at SMU, Collins compiled a 43–14–1 record. His only losing season as a coach came in 1976, when he went 3–8 at Southern Miss. From 1982 to 1984, he put together the best stretch in SMU's history, going 31–4–1.

After the 1986 season, Collins, athletic director Bob Hitch and recruiting coordinator Henry Lee Parker were interviewed by WFAA-TV's Dale Hansen regarding allegations that players were being paid.  Collins denied any knowledge of the affair. It later emerged that Collins knew that players were being paid, though he didn't know who they were.  Collins resigned shortly after WFAA aired a special report breaking the scandal, and was later given $850,000 in severance pay in return for keeping quiet about the payments.

Collins was not sanctioned by the NCAA for any role in the events leading up to the "death penalty", though the final report criticized him for not providing a convincing explanation for why players were still being paid after the school assured the NCAA that the payments had stopped.  Nonetheless, his reputation was ruined.  While he was a finalist for the open head coach's job at Mississippi State in 1990 (which eventually went to Jackie Sherrill), he never returned to the collegiate ranks in any capacity since leaving SMU. He spent his remaining years raising charity for Southern Miss. On November 15, 2021, Collins died at the age of 88.

Head coaching record

References

1933 births
2021 deaths
American football quarterbacks
Colorado State Rams football coaches
George Washington Colonials football coaches
Mississippi State Bulldogs football coaches
Mississippi State Bulldogs football players
North Carolina Tar Heels football coaches
Southern Miss Golden Eagles football coaches
SMU Mustangs football coaches
Virginia Tech Hokies football coaches
People from Laurel, Mississippi
Coaches of American football from  Mississippi
Players of American football from  Mississippi